Balmoral Junior Secondary School was a public high school in North Vancouver, British Columbia, Canada, part of School District 44 North Vancouver.  Since the French immersion program left Balmoral Junior Secondary in 2003, that institution saw declining enrollment, to the point where the school closed in 2009. The property has since been repurposed to hold the grade 8 and 9 classes of Carson Graham Secondary while that school undergoes a facilities upgrade. The Balmoral building, redesignated as the Carson Graham Secondary Balmoral Campus, was phased out in 2012 following the completion of the work at Carson Graham.
In 2013 it became Mountainside Secondary School, an alternative school for students between grades 9 and 12.

History
Balmoral Junior Secondary School opened in about 1959 to serve Grades 7, 8 and 9 students in the northwest area of the District of North Vancouver.  It was intended as a feeder to Delbrook Senior Secondary a few blocks away.  In 1969 Balmoral split the grade 10 class with Delbrook.

In January 1977 the Delbrook building was destroyed by fire, necessitating Balmoral accommodating both schools' students and staff until the end of June.  Following this, Balmoral became a feeder school to Carson Graham Secondary School.

In 2009, Balmoral ceased to exist as a separate school and became the second campus to Carson Graham Secondary School.

The Balmoral site closed in 2012 and in 2013 the school was replaced with Mountainside Secondary School, with an alternative education program.

Honour Roll
1960 Susan Chapman / Peter Greg
1961 Rod Holloway
1962 Fred Chapman
1963 Cherry Pye / Bill Chapman
1964 Christine Brewer
1965 Kathy Brown / John Weymark
1966 Ken Anderson / Bill MacLeod
1967 Scott Diffley / Leanne Excell
1968 Janet Clarke
1969 Ted Hutchinson
1971 Stuart Thistlewaite
1974 Clint Fox
1975 Lisa Peters
1976 Kelly Grant
1977 Wendy Earl
1978 Cameron Bruce
1979 Mary Graves
1980 Linda MacGregor (Also Awarded Top Athlete)
1981 Liam Kearns
1982 Tami Redekop
1983 Jenny Lo
1984 Elizabeth Pagdin
1985 Katie Fairley / Kevin White
1986 Debbie Lisle
1987 Andrea Wiebe
1988 Rochelle Stariha
1989 Navida Shivji
1990 Sophie Yendole
1991 Bruce Sled
1992 Angus Fergusson
1993 Natalya Nicholson
1994 Laura Campbell
1995 Rebecca Webster
1996 Roxanne Chow
1997 Christopher Armstrong
1998 Kitt Turney
1999 Barbora Farkas
2000 Michelle Arduini
2001 Katie MacKay
2002 Ornella Sabti
2003 Vanessa Janzen
2004 Elizabeth Kennedy / Brooke MacGillivary
2005 Peter Christiansen
2006 Kikuko Araki

Athletics
From its opening, Balmoral was known for its superior rugby program.  Under Coach Bob Payne in the 1960s the bantam and juvenile teams often went undefeated in a season, and were unscored upon in a few.  The grade 8 and grade 9 rugby were perennial Vancouver and District champions.  In 1969 the school fielded a grade 10 boys' team for the first time.  The school has produced numerous Canada U-19 and U-21 players and, at last count, three full international senior players; Tony Scott (1973), Ron Johnstone (2001–present), and Kelly McCallum (2003).

In 1997 they became only the third junior high school in the 33-year history of the B.C. High School Wrestling Championships to finish fourth.

In 2007 Balmoral beat Seycove in Boys Soccer for their league junior championship.  They were the runners-up for the Vancouver and District title.

Closure
In the 2006–2007 school year the North Vancouver School District put Balmoral on a list of schools slated for closure due to declining enrollment. The school parent advisory committee started a campaign to find more funding and keep the school open.

The PAC's presentations presented a strategy to keep the school open, called the International Baccalaureate Program, which was approved in 2007.

In 2009, the school district twinned an immediate rebuild of Carson Graham School with the closure of Balmoral in 2012. At issue was either the construction of a seismically sound, single facility at the Carson Graham site for 1,100 students, or the maintenance of two sites, both with aging facilities and one with under 300 students.

Drama and musical theatre program
Balmoral's Drama Program rivalled many others on the North Shore, second only to Sentinel Secondary School. It was headed up by Ms. A Reale with the some assistance from Tim Cadney. The program put on around 5–7 different shows each year, including spring and fall festivals.

Productions
Drama
Originality 2004
Village Of Idiots 2006
Grounded 2006 (also performed at the North Vancouver Drama Festival)

Musical theatre
The Boyfriend 1993
Little Shop of Horrors 1994
Bye Bye Birdie 1995
Godspell 1996
Pippin 2003
Annie 2004
Grease 2004
Cats 2005
Once On This Island 2006
Footloose 2006
Grease 2007
Franklin Falls (Written By Courtenay Ennis and Directed By Tim Cadney) 2007
Chicago 2008
Little Shop Of Horrors 2008
Shevil 2009

Most of these musicals were directed by Tim Cadney or Richard Berg. The Musical Direction was done by either Chris King or Courtenay Ennis.

See also
Carson Graham Secondary School
Delbrook Senior Secondary School
Mountainside Secondary School

References

High schools in British Columbia
Educational institutions established in 1959
1959 establishments in British Columbia